The Pacific Fleet (translit: Tikhookeanskiy flot) is the Russian Navy fleet in the Pacific Ocean.

Established in 1731 as part of the Imperial Russian Navy, the fleet was known as the Okhotsk Military Flotilla (1731–1856) and Siberian Military Flotilla (1856–1918), formed to defend Russian interests in the Russian Far East region along the Pacific coast. In 1918 the fleet was inherited by the Russian SFSR, then the Soviet Union in 1922 as part of the Soviet Navy, being reformed several times before being disbanded in 1926. In 1932 it was re-established as the Pacific Fleet, and was known as the Red Banner Pacific Fleet after World War II as it had earned the Order of the Red Banner. In the Soviet years, the fleet was also responsible for the Soviet Navy's operations in the Indian Ocean and Arabian Sea. Following the collapse of the Soviet Union in 1991, the Red Banner Pacific Fleet was inherited by the Russian Federation as part of the Russian Navy and its current name was adopted.

The Pacific Fleet's headquarters is located in Fokino, formerly Vladivostok with numerous facilities within the Peter the Great Gulf in Primorsky Krai, and Petropavlovsk-Kamchatsky and Vilyuchinsk in Avacha Bay on the Kamchatka Peninsula in Kamchatka Krai. Following the APEC Russia 2012 summit, it was announced that the main naval base of the Pacific Fleet in the Russian Far East will be moved to the town of Fokino, Primorsky Krai. The current commander is Admiral Sergei Avakyants, who has held the position since May 2012.

History

In 1731, the Imperial Russian Navy created the Okhotsk Military Flotilla under its first commander, Grigoriy Skornyakov-Pisarev, to patrol and transport government goods to and from Kamchatka. In 1799, 3 frigates and 3 smaller ships were sent to Okhotsk under the command of Rear-Admiral I. Fomin to form a functioning military flotilla. In 1849, Petropavlovsk-na-Kamchatke became the Flotilla's principal base, which a year later would be transferred to Nikolayevsk-on-Amur and later to Vladivostok in 1871. In 1854, the men of the Flotilla distinguished themselves in the defense of Petropavlovsk-Kamchatskiy during the Crimean War, (1853–1856). In 1856, the Okhotsk Military Flotilla changed its name to the "Siberian Military Flotilla".

In 1860, the provisions of the Convention of Peking ceded parts of Outer Manchuria in northeastern China, including the modern day Primorsky Krai to the Russian Empire. A large squadron under Rear Admiral A. A. Popov was sent from the Baltic Fleet to the Pacific Ocean. During the American Civil War ships of the squadron visited San Francisco while the Baltic Fleet visited New York City. Parts of the squadron, including the Finnish corvette Kalevala, returned to the Baltic in 1865.

At the turn of the 20th century, the Flotilla was still small in numbers. Owing to a gradual deterioration in Russo-Japanese relations, the Imperial Russian government adopted a special shipbuilding program to meet the needs of the Russian Far East region, but its execution dragged on and in addition there were several clashes and defeats between Russian and Imperial Japanese Navy vessels. In response, the Naval headquarters in St. Petersburg ordered the Baltic Fleet to the Pacific to reinforce Russian naval forces, primarily the First Pacific Squadron on the east coast of Asia and its naval base at Port Arthur.

By the beginning of the Russo-Japanese War of 1904–1905, Imperial Russian naval forces in the Far East consisted of the 1st Pacific Squadron (7 battleships, 7 cruisers, 13 torpedo boats, 2 gunboats) and a number of ships from the "Siberian Military Flotilla" (2 minelayers, 12 torpedo boats and 5 gunboats), based in Port Arthur. Other ships of the "Siberian Military Flotilla" (4 cruisers, 10 torpedo boats) were stationed in Vladivostok.

During the Russo-Japanese War, most of the Russian Navy in the Pacific was destroyed. The Russian Baltic Fleet under Admiral Zinovy Rozhestvensky, renamed the Second Pacific Squadron, was defeated at the Battle of Tsushima.

During the Russian Revolution of 1905, the sailors of the Pacific Fleet were actively engaged in the revolutionary movement, participating in armed revolts in Vladivostok in January 1906 and October 1907. During the October Revolution of 1917, the sailors of the Siberian and Amur military flotillas fought for the establishment of Soviet authority in the Far East and against the White army and interventionists. During the Russian Civil War, almost all of the ships of the Pacific Fleet were seized by the White army and the Japanese. After the departure of the interventionists in 1922, the Soviets created the Naval Forces of the Far East, under commander Ivan Kozhanov, as a part of the Vladivostok unit, and the Amur Military Flotilla (Амурская военная флотилия, or Amurskaya voyennaya flotiliya). In 1926, these were disbanded: the Vladivostok unit was transferred to the command of the frontier troops in the Far East, and the Amur flotilla became a flotilla of its own.

Establishment in 1932
Owing to Japanese aggression in Manchuria in 1931, the Central Committee and the Soviet government decided to create the Naval Forces in the Far East on 13 April 1932. In January 1935, they were renamed the Pacific Fleet, under commander M. Viktorov. The creation of the fleet entailed great difficulties. The first units were formed with small ships delivered by railroad. In 1932, the torpedo boat squadron and eight submarines were put into service. In 1934, the Pacific Fleet received 26 small submarines. The creation of the naval aviation and coastal artillery was underway. In 1937, they opened the Pacific Military School.

By the beginning of World War II, the Pacific Fleet had two surface ship subdivisions, four submarine subdivisions, one torpedo boat subdivision, a few squadrons of ships and patrol boats, airborne units, coastal artillery and marines.

World War II

During the Great Patriotic War (the Soviet World War II campaign against Germany from 1941 to 1945) the Pacific Fleet was in a permanent state of alert and ready for action, although the Soviets remained neutral with respect to the Empire of Japan, the only Axis power in the Pacific, even after Japan entered World War II. At the same time, the Soviets transferred a destroyer leader, two destroyers, and five submarines from the Pacific Fleet to the Northern Fleet. More than 140,000 sailors from the Pacific Fleet were incorporated in the rifle brigades and other units on the Soviet front against Germans in Europe. By August 1945, the Pacific Fleet consisted of two cruisers, one destroyer leader, ten destroyers, two torpedo boats, 19 patrol boats, 78 submarines, ten minelayers, 52 minesweepers, 49 "MO" anti-submarine boats (MO stands for Малый Охотник, or "little hunter"), 204 motor torpedo boats and 1459 war planes.

During the Soviet–Japanese War of 1945, the Pacific Fleet participated in the removal of the Empire of Japan from Northern Korea (a part of the Manchurian Operation of 1945), in the Invasion of South Sakhalin and the Kuril Islands Landing Operation the same year.

Thousands of sailors and officers were awarded orders and medals for outstanding military service; more than fifty men received the title Hero of the Soviet Union. Eighteen ships and fleet units received the title of the Soviet Guards, and sixteen were awarded the Order of the Red Banner.

Cold War
On 5 May 1965, the Pacific Fleet itself was awarded with the Order of the Red Banner.

The Pacific Fleet started deploying forces to the Indian Ocean, and established the 8th Operational (Indian Ocean) Squadron in 1968, after the British government announced its intention to withdraw its military forces east of the Suez Canal by 1971. In addition to the defensive function of balancing the naval strength in the Indian Ocean against that of the United States Navy, the 8th Squadron played a role in promoting Soviet foreign policy. Regular visits and port calls were made in the Indian subcontinent, the Persian Gulf, and the East African coast.

The 8th Operational Squadron grew quite substantial at times; in 1980, a Soviet flotilla of 'about ten guided missile cruisers, destroyers and frigates and more than a dozen support ships' was juxtaposed to the U.S. Navy's Task Force 70 in the region. There were also 23 other Soviet ships in the South China Sea, at the same time. In addition, Soviet Ilyushin Il-38 reconnaissance planes, based in Aden or Ethiopia, maintained a close watch on U.S. vessels, as did Ka-25 Hormone helicopters from Soviet warships. In 1981 the fleet suffered the loss of many of its senior officers, including its commander in chief, Admiral Emil Spiridonov, when the Tupolev Tu-104 transporting them back to Vladivostok after meetings in Leningrad crashed shortly after takeoff from Pushkin Airport. A total of 16 admirals and generals, and 38 lower ranking officers, were killed.

In the 1980s, Soviet naval strategy shifted to an emphasis on bastion defense, fortifying the Sea of Okhotsk for that purpose. By the mid-1980s, the Pacific Fleet had constituted 32% of all Soviet naval assets, up from 28% in 1975 and 25% in 1965. It included approximately 800 ships, over 120 submarines, and 98 surface combatants. The battlecruiser Admiral Lazarev of the  served with the fleet in the 1980s and 1990s as well.

In 1988 the Primorskiy Flotilla (Military Unit Number 20885) comprised the 165th Missile Ship Brigade (Uliss Bay (Vladivostok)); the     202nd Anti-Submarine Warfare Brigade (Abrek Bay (Fokino), Primorskiy Kray); the 4th Brigade of Constructed and Overhauled Submarines (Vladivostok, Primorskiy Kray); the 72nd Brigade of Constructed and Overhauled Submarines (Bolshoy Kamen, Primorskiy Kray); the 45th and 47th 
Coastal Defence Brigades; the 7th Minesweeper Brigade (Razboynik Bay (Vladivostok), Primorskiy Kray); and the 19th Submarine Brigade (Uliss Bay, Vladivostok.

Recent events
In the 1990s and 2000s, the Pacific Fleet lost many of its larger units. Within a few years after the collapse of the Soviet Union, the Fleet lost all its aircraft carriers, and by early 2000 only one cruiser remained active with the Fleet. By the end of the 2010s, the Fleet consisted of one large missile cruiser, five destroyers, ten nuclear submarines, eight diesel-electric submarines plus numerous light units, amphibious ships and auxiliaries.

Between 5–12 July 2013, warships from the Russian Pacific Fleet and the North Sea Fleet of the People's Liberation Army Navy participated in Joint Sea 2013, bilateral naval maneuvers held in the Peter the Great Bay. Joint Sea 2013 was the largest naval drills yet undertaken by the PRC's navy with a foreign navy. In 2021, a joint Russian-Chinese squadron sailed around Japan, passing between Japanese islands through the Tsugaru Strait and then the Osumi Strait. The Russian ships in the squadron included the destroyers Admiral Panteleyev and Admiral Tributs, the corvettes Aldar Tsydenzhapov and Gromkiy as well as auxiliaries.

Plans for deployment of new large units to the Fleet were announced in the early 2010s. Several new ballistic missile submarines, and large cruisers were projected to join the Fleet. However, these plans evolved over the course of the decade with a changed focus by 2020 on light units and submarines to renew the fleet. In this regard, the focus is now on new general purpose frigates (Gorshkov-class), multi-role and missile corvettes (Steregushchiy-class, Gremyashchiy-class and Karakurt-class) as well as on a full range of new submarines (the Borei, Yasen and Improved Kilo classes). Vessels of these classes are all projected to enter service through the 2020s. In addition, the Pacific Fleet's amphibious capabilities will be modernized in the mid-latter 2020s through the acquisition of one or more of the Ivan Gren-class landing ships and possibly one of the new Priboy-class helicopter assault ships.

While existing ballistic-missile submarine production will fully replace and increase numbers of SSBNs in the Pacific Fleet, it is unclear that the production of the Yasen-class vessels, and potential follow-on models, will be sufficient to replace aging older nuclear attack and cruise missile submarines on a one-for-one basis. Reports suggest that Russian third-generation nuclear submarines have not been modernized to a level to avoid block obsolescence before 2030. The 2016 decision to add six new "Improved Kilo"-class conventionally-powered submarines to the fleet may be partly designed to mitigate such a gap.

2008 submarine accident

An accident aboard , a nuclear-powered attack submarine doing a test run during sea trials in the Sea of Japan on 8 November 2008, killed more than 20 people, marking the worst submarine disaster since Kursk sank in 2000.
Nerpa was an  belonging to the Pacific Fleet. Its construction began in 1991, but was delayed due to lack of funding.

Order of Battle

The Pacific Fleet is one component of the Russian Eastern Military District established in 2010. Other components of the Eastern District include the 11th Air and Air Defence Forces Army (providing both aviation and air defence units in the District) as well as four ground force army headquarters (the 5th, 29th, 35th and 36th Combined Arms Armies) and one independent corps HQ (the 68th) on Sakhalin island.

The Russian Coast Guard provides additional armed patrol capabilities in the Pacific, including two Krivak-class frigates.

Surface Warships

Submarines

Other Surface Units

 Mine Countermeasures Ships:
 Natya-class: 2 Vessels (MT-264, 265); both active as of 2022
 Sonya-class: 7 Vessels (BT-100, 114, 215, 232, 245, 256, 325) 
 Alexandrit-class: 3 Vessels (Yakov Balyaev entered service 2020 and Petr Ilyichev in November 2022; Anatoly Shlemov - commissioned 29 December 2022; vessels reported to be part of the 114th Brigade of the Pacific Fleet)
 Patrol/Anti-Saboteur Boats:
 Grachonok-class anti-saboteur ship: 6 Vessels (P-377; P-417 Yunarmeets Kamchatki; P-420 Yunarmeets Primorya; P-431 Yunarmeets Chukotki; P-445, P-450 Yunarmeets Sakhalina)
 Intelligence/Tracking Vessels:
 Vishnya-class intelligence ship Kareliya (assigned to 515th division of reconnaissance ships; active as of 2023)
 Marshal Nedelin-class intelligence ship Marshal Krylov (active as of 2022; assigned to the 114th Brigade of the Pacific Fleet)
 Fleet Oilers:
 Boris Chilikin-class: 1 vessel (Boris Butoma - deployed in the Mediterranean May to October 2022) 
 Dubna-class: 2 vessels (Irkut active as of 2020/2021; Pechanga active as of 2022)
 Uda-class: 1 vessel (Vishera)
 Altay-class: 2 vessels (Ilim and Izhora - latter vessel reported active as of 2022)
 Hydrographic Survey Vessels: 4 Yug-class (Project 862) vessels
 Vice-Admiral Vorontsov (formerly Briz)
 Gals 
 Marshal Gelovani 
 Pegas
 Icebreakers: 
 Project 97 Icebreakers: 2 vessels: Ivan Susanin (active as of 2022) and Sadko
 Yevpaty Kolovrat (Project 21180M icebreaker; being transferred to the Pacific Fleet as of 2023)
 Other Support Ships:
 Project 304-class Repair Ships: 6 vessels (PM-5, PM-15, PM-52, PM-59, PM-92, PM-97, PM-156)

Naval Aviation
Naval Aviation of the Pacific Fleet:
568th Independent Composite Aviation Regiment – HQ at Mongokhto – Tu-142MR/MZ/M3 (Bear-F) maritime-patrol/ASW aircraft (M3 (Bear-F) variant reported delivered as of 2020);
317th Mixed Aviation Regiment – HQ at Yelizovo – One Squadron with Il-38/N ASW aircraft (upgrading with N-model variant of the aircraft as of 2017); One Squadron reported deploying upgraded MiG-31BM fighters (2020). 
865th Red Banner Order of Labour Fighter Aviation Regiment PVO (Regiment transferred to Pacific Fleet on 1 July 1998; disbanded 2010; reported as likely to reform as of 2019 but status still unclear as of 2021) – HQ at Yelizovo-Petropavlovsk-Kamchatsky Airport – MiG-31B/M fighters (planned as of 2019) 
 Pacific Fleet MiG-31s (including K-variant with Kh-47M2 Kinzhal ASM) also reported deployed at Anadyr airport in the Chukotka region (December 2020) with further potential forward operating locations at Wrangel Island and elsewhere.
71st Independent Military Transport Air Squadron – HQ at Nikolayevka, Primorskaya – An-12, An-24, An-26;
175th Independent Shipborne Anti-submarine Helicopter Squadron – HQ at Yelizovo – Ka-27 ASW helicopters;
289th Independent Anti-submarine Air Regiment – HQ at Nikolayevka – Il-38/N ASW aircraft; Ka-27 ASW and Ka-29 attack helicopters.

Additional aviation and air defence assets in the Eastern Military District are deployed as part of the 11th Air and Air Defence Forces Army, including  Su-35s at Yelizovo on the Kamchatka Peninsula (deployed there on rotation as of  2021).

Tu-95MS and Tu-22M3 bombers (including with Kh-47M2 Kinzhal hypersonic and Kh-32 long-range supersonic anti-ship missiles) deployed as part of Russian Long-Range Aviation, including in the Eastern Military District.

Ground Forces 
According to a report from the Institute for the Study of War, in March 2018 the Fleet contained two naval infantry brigades, a coastal brigade, and coastal regiment. However, an expansion of these capabilities, introducing new units and formations, was underway as of 2020/21. In 2022, both of the Pacific Fleet's naval infantry brigades were transferred to Ukraine for operations as part of the Russian invasion. Up to the end of 2022, both brigades have reportedly experienced heavy losses. In April 2022, the 155th Brigade was reportedly awarded the "Guards" title for its service.

 Fleet Headquarters, Vladivostok commanded by Admiral Vladimir Ivanovich Korolev
 Naval Infantry
 40th Separate Naval Infantry Brigade, Petropavlovsk-Kamchatsky
 155th Separate Guards Naval Infantry Brigade, Vladivostok (re-equipping with BMP-3F amphibious infantry fighting vehicles as of 2021; both 40th and 155th brigades also re-equipped with T-80BVM main battle tanks in 2021) Elements of 155th Brigade reportedly deployed to Belarus in the context of the Ukraine crisis in January 2022, and actively participated in 2022 Russian invasion of Ukraine. Both Brigades reportedly lost many soldiers near Pavlivka.
 42nd Maritime Recon Point (Special Forces battalion), Vladivostok
 Coastal Defence
 Division-sized formation reported being established in Chukotka region as of 2021
 Coastal Defence Surface-to-Surface Missile Units
 520th Separate Coastal Missile Artillery Brigade, Petropavlovsk-Kamchatsky
 2 Battalions/Squadrons with K-300 Bastion Surface-to-Surface Missiles (as of 2018; additional units reported forming with the aim of 3-5 Bastion and 1-2 SSC-6 Bal battalions/squadrons).
 72nd Separate Coastal Missile Brigade (units equipped with Bastion SSM (Iturup Island, Matua Island and Paramushir Island) and Bal SSM battalion (Kunashir Island)), HQ: Vladivostok
 New Coastal Missile Brigade reported being established in 2021 to defend Sakhalin.

Commanders of the Pacific Fleet
Mikhail Vladimirovich Viktorov (from April 1932)
Grigoriy Petrovich Kireyev (from August 1937)
Nikolay Gerasimovich Kuznetsov (from January 1938)
Ivan Stepanovich Yumashev (from August 1939)

In January 1947, the Pacific Fleet was divided into the 5th and 7th fleets:

In April 1953, the Fleets were once again combined under one Pacific Fleet command:
Yuriy Aleksandrovich Panteleyev (from January 1953)
Valentin Andreyevich Chekurov (from January 1956)
Vitaliy Alekseyevich Fokin (from February 1958)
Nikolay Nikolayevich Amelko (from June 1962)
Nikolai Ivanovich Smirnov (from March 1969)
Vladimir Petrovich Maslov (from September 1974)
Emil Nikolayevich Spiridonov (from August 1979)
Vladimir Vasilyevich Sidorov (from February 1986)
Gennadiy Aleksandrovich Khvatov (From December 1986)
Georgiy Nikolayevich Gurinov (from March 1993)
Igor Nikolayevich Khmelnov (from August 1994)
Vladimir Ivanovich Kuroyedov (from February 1996)
Mikhail Georgiyevich Zakharenko (from July 1997)
Gennadiy Aleksandrovich Suchkov (from July 2001)
Viktor Dmitriyevich Fedorov (from December 2001)
Konstantin Semyonovich Sidenko (from December 2007)
Sergey Iosifovich Avakyants (Acting from August 2010 – appointed Commander since 3 May 2012)

See also
 Grigory Pasko – former officer of the Russian Navy, editor of Boyevaya Vakhta (Battle Watch), in-house newspaper of the Pacific Fleet, and prisoner of conscience
Bechevinka, former submarine base of the fleet

References

Further reading
 

Russian fleets
Pacific Coast of Russia
Imperial Russian Navy
Pacific Fleet
Sea of Japan
Russian Far East
Vladivostok
Military units and formations established in 1731
1731 establishments in Asia
1730s establishments in the Russian Empire
Military units and formations awarded the Order of the Red Banner